Dattu  is a place belongs to Ward No 9 of Mahakali Municipality in Darchula District in Sudurpashchim Province of western Nepal. At the time of the 1991 Nepal census it had a population of 1832 people living in 344 individual households. It consist of 9 sub regions: Sakar, Thapala, Mali Dattu, Bait, Ulaini, Tali Dattu, Udyai, Kholi, Chuchai. The south part is border with India which is separated by the Mahakali River, and the Indian markets Baluwakot and Ghatiwagad are connected by a hanging bridge, which helps access to Indian markets and trading business among residents and others nearby. The cultural relationship with India has also strengthened the ties among both countries' residents.

References

External links
UN map of the municipalities of Darchula District

Populated places in Darchula District